Mattiastrum is a genus of flowering plants belonging to the family Boraginaceae.

Its native range is Crete to Pakistan. It is found in Afghanistan, Cyprus, East Aegean Is., Iran, Iraq, Kazakhstan, Lebanon-Syria, Pakistan, Palestine  and Turkey.
 
The genus name of Mattiastrum is in honour of Elisabeth von Matt (1762–1814), an Austrian astronomer who is regarded as the only female scientist to have her observations published in European astronomy journals during the late 18th and early 19th century. 
It was first described and published in Repert. Spec. Nov. Regni Veg. Vol.14 on page 150 in 1915.

Known species
According to Kew:

Mattiastrum amani 
Mattiastrum artvinense 
Mattiastrum asperum 
Mattiastrum aucheri 
Mattiastrum badghysii 
Mattiastrum calycinum 
Mattiastrum cappadocicum 
Mattiastrum corymbiforme 
Mattiastrum cristatum 
Mattiastrum dielsii 
Mattiastrum dieterlei 
Mattiastrum erysimifolium 
Mattiastrum flaviflorum 
Mattiastrum formosum 
Mattiastrum incanum 
Mattiastrum karakoricum 
Mattiastrum karataviense 
Mattiastrum kurdistanicum 
Mattiastrum lamprocarpum 
Mattiastrum laxiflorum 
Mattiastrum leptophyllum 
Mattiastrum lithospermifolium 
Mattiastrum longipes 
Mattiastrum luristanicum 
Mattiastrum modestum 
Mattiastrum montbretii 
Mattiastrum multicaule 
Mattiastrum paphlagonicum 
Mattiastrum polycarpum 
Mattiastrum racemosum 
Mattiastrum reuteri 
Mattiastrum sessiliflorum 
Mattiastrum shepardii 
Mattiastrum stenolophum 
Mattiastrum subscaposum

References

Boraginoideae
Boraginaceae genera
Plants described in 1915
Flora of Crete
Flora of Kazakhstan
Flora of the Transcaucasus
Flora of Western Asia